Colobane Arrondissement is an arrondissement of the Gossas Department in the Fatick Region of Senegal.

Subdivisions
The arrondissement is divided administratively into rural communities and in turn into villages.

Arrondissements of Senegal
Fatick Region